Santa Cruz, officially the Municipality of Santa Cruz,  is a first class municipality and capital of the province of Laguna, Philippines. According to the 2020 census, it has a population of 123,574 people.

Santa Cruz is situated on the banks of the Santa Cruz River which flows into the eastern part of Laguna de Bay. The town is bounded by the Bay on the north, by Lumban and Pagsanjan towns in the east, Pagsanjan and Magdalena towns in the south, and Pila in the west. It is accessible by land from Metro Manila passing through Rizal Province via Manila East Road or via South Luzon Expressway

Santa Cruz is considered as the service and commercial center on the eastern part of the province. The town is composed of five barangays in the Poblacion area and 21 classified urban barangays. Although relatively far from the immediate urbanizing influence of Metropolitan Manila, Santa Cruz continues to progress. It is now classified as first class municipality. The present administration is headed by the Mayor Egay San Luis Sr.. Santa Cruz is also the seat of the provincial government since 1885, giving the municipality an additional administrative function over the entire province. It also functions as the service center for transportation, commerce, health, education, and other social services for the predominantly rural north-eastern municipalities of the province. Boosting the economy of the municipality are the incipient and fast-growing agribusiness industries such as livestock raising, horticulture and aquaculture. The town is composed of twenty-six (26) urban barangays. All barangays are being classified as urban.

The development of Santa Cruz as the administrative, commercial, and service center of Laguna makes it accessible for all private/public vehicles going to nearby places particularly Pagsanjan, Lake Caliraya, Liliw, Paete and Nagcarlan.

History

During the last decade of the 16th century, Santa Cruz was once a well populated barrio of the present municipality of Lumban, as well as other contemporary towns like Pagsanjan, Cavinti, Paete and Pangil. On September 6, 1602, Santa Cruz separated from Lumban and became a pueblo with its church and local government.

Since its foundation in 1602, the town had been ravaged by calamitous forces such as fires, typhoons, floods and human vandalism during the Philippine Revolution of 1896–1899, the war of the Philippine Independence (1899–1902), Battle of Santa Cruz, the assault of the Tulisanes (bandits) during the Spanish times. The Filipino troops of the pre-war 4th and 42nd Infantry Division of the Philippine Commonwealth Army and recognized guerrillas also came from the town and was involved in the Second Battle of Santa Cruz on January 26, 1945.

Characterized by fertile flat lands situated along the coastal plains of Laguna de Bay, the economic base of the town had been traditionally anchored on two primary industries, namely agriculture and fishing which still remain up to the present. In view of the strategic location of Santa Cruz relative to the other coastal settlements about the lake, trading activities have likewise rooted on the town during those early settlement days. The town proper which has always been the focal point of activities used to be accessible to the other lake-shore areas due to the navigable Santa Cruz River aside from Laguna de Bay itself. Since those early days, water is the principal mode of transportation.

Today, Santa Cruz serves as the capital of Laguna and is considered as the business and commercial center on the eastern part of the province.

Geography
The municipality is bounded on the north and north-west by Laguna de Bay, on the north-east by Lumban, on the east by Pagsanjan, on the southeast by Magdalena, on the south by Liliw, and on the south-west by Pila. It has 26 barangays and covers approximate land area of 3860 hectares which comprises about 2% of the total land area of Laguna Province.

Land Area: 3,860 hectares
Residential: 381.97
Commercial: 35.96
Institutional: 92.17
Functional Open Space: 31.27
Roads: 157.73
Total Built-up: 696.10
Agricultural: 3,048.57
Special Use: 115.33

Geology
The two types of rocks found in Santa Cruz are alluvium and clastic rocks. Clastic rocks are located at the eastern portion of the municipality specifically in Barangay Alipit, San Jose, Oogong, Jasaan, San Juan, Palasan, and portions of Barangays Pagsawitan, Patimbao, Bubukal, Labuin and Malinao. These rocks consist of inter-bedded shale and sandstone with occasional thin lenses of limestone, tuff, and reworked sandy tuffs, calcareous sandstone and partly tuffaceous shale.

Climate
Like most areas in the province of Laguna, the climate of Santa Cruz is characterized by two pronounced seasons: dry from January to April and wet during the rest of the year. The municipality has annual temperature of 27.2 degree Celsius and annual rainfall of 1962.7mm. Northeasterly winds with an average wind speed of 9 knots prevail in the municipality.

Barangays
Santa Cruz is politically subdivided into 26 barangays.

 Alipit
 Bagumbayan
 Bubukal
 Calios
 Duhat
 Gatid
 Jasaan
 Labuin
 Malinao
 Oogong
 Pagsawitan
 Palasan
 Patimbao
 Poblacion I
 Poblacion II
 Poblacion III
 Poblacion IV
 Poblacion V
 Poblacion VI New
 Poblacion VII New
 Poblacion VIII New
 San Jose
 San Juan
 San Pablo Norte
 San Pablo Sur
 Santisima Cruz
 Santo Angel Central
 Santo Angel Norte
 Santo Angel Sur

Demographics

Economy

Commerce
The provincial capital of Laguna, Santa Cruz serves as service center of the province particularly for the municipalities on its north-eastern part.

Trade and commerce remain to be one of the primary economic activities in the locality. The presence of jeepney services plying Lumban, Paete, Siniloan, San Pablo, Pila, Victoria, Cavinti-Caliraya, Luisiana, Majayjay, Calumpang, Nagcarlan, Liliw, Magdalena, Pagsanjan, Lucban, Lucena and Calamba has further enhanced the municipality's role as a commerce and trade center.

The center of business activities is in the poblacion specifically at Barangay V where the four (4) buildings of Public Market is situated.

Santa Cruz has many establishment that contribute to its development. Development in this vicinity has been a quasi-residential commercial type as manifested by the proliferation of structures which are used both for business and residential purposes by the proprietors/owners. There is also a concentration of business establishments at the section of the national highway/expressway especially Barangay Gatid where a Mall is located, and the abandoned PNR Railway (road) while a strip pattern of commercial development is noticeable along the Quezon Avenue and along the old highway and Pedro Guevarra Avenue.  Along P Guevarra Avenue, several establishments are also located such as Hospitals, Meralco office, PLDT office, Red Cross, several Banking Institutions, and Executive Eminent Lending Company.  There is also SL Agritech Corporation,  in Barangay Oogong, Santa Cruz, Laguna.

Tax collection
Annual local government collection:
2008 — ₱ 160,196,679.38
2007 — ₱ 135,792,097.46
2006 — ₱ 128,812,429.41
2005 — ₱ 117,351,293.14

Points of interest
Santa Cruz may not have natural tourist spots and no wide areas to develop but one thing the townsmen of Santa Cruz are proud of are the local foods available in the town. Santa Cruz boasts of the famous white cheese or kesong puti, freshly made from carabao's milk.

 Immaculate Concepcion Parish Church
 Emilio Jacinto Shrine Burial Site
 Villa Valenzuela
 Santa Cruz Town Plaza
 Provincial Capitol of Laguna
 Aglipayan Cathedral with our Lady of maulawin shrine.

Gallery

Events
Santa Cruz hosted the Palarong Pambansa from May 4–10, 2014.

Festivals
 Kesong puti Festival — April 4–11
 Anilag Festival — March 8–17

List of Mayors

Elections

2022 Santa Cruz local elections

|-
| colspan="5" style="background:#000000;" |
|-

2019 Santa Cruz local elections

2016 Santa Cruz local elections

2013 Santa Cruz local elections

2010 Santa Cruz local elections

Education

Kindergarten schools
 Public: 35
 Private: 12

Elementary (primary and intermediate)
 Public: 16
 Private: 11

High schools
 Public: 2
 Private: 6

Colleges:
 Public: 2
 Private: 8

Vocational
 Public: 1
 Private: 2

Number of students
 Elementary: 15,291
 High school: 8,155
 Tertiary: 10,914

Partial list of schools

Hospitals
Private Hospitals: 4
Rural Health Units: 2
Government Hospital: 1
Health Centers 26
 Laguna Medical Center
 Santa Cruz Laguna Polymedic, Inc.
 Laguna Doctors Hospital
 Laguna Holy Family Hospital
 Jesus the Saviour Hospital

Notable people
 Gen. Juan Cailles - First Filipino Military Governor of Laguna, Teacher, Soldier, and Public Servant
 Gen. Agueda Kahabagan - First Filipino Female General of 1st Republic of the Philippines
 Pedro Guevara - Soldier, Legislator, Lawyer and Writer
 Eduardo Quisumbing - National Scientist of the Philippines for Plant Taxonomy, Systematics, and Morphology
 Emil Q. Javier, National Scientist of the Philippines for Agriculture, and 17th President of the University of the Philippines
 Nena Saguil - modernist and abstract art painter
 Socorro Ramos – entrepreneur and co-founder of National Book Store, the largest bookstore chain in the Philippines.
 Carmina Villarroel - Filipina actress, presenter, former child actress.
 Gov. Felicisimo T. San Luis - Former Provincial Governor of Laguna (1960–1992)
 Jacinto Vallenzuela - Former Mayor (1926–1929)
 Ariel Magcalas - Former Mayor (2007–2010)
 Rodolfo S. San Luis - Former Mayor and Representative of the 4th District of Laguna
 Henry Bautista - Former Mayor (1995 to 1998)
 Domingo G. Panganiban - Former Mayor (1998–2007; 2010–2019)

Sister cities

  Makati, Philippines

References

External links

 [ Philippine Standard Geographic Code]
 Philippine Census Information
 Local Governance Performance Management System
 Santa Cruz, Laguna(Official Website) 
 Profile of Santa Cruz, Laguna

Municipalities of Laguna (province)
Provincial capitals of the Philippines
Populated places on Laguna de Bay